Pantelimon M. Vizirescu (August 16, 1903–January 27, 2000) was a Romanian poet and essayist.

Born in Braneț, Olt County, his parents Marin Vizirescu and Maria (née Pietreanu) were agricultural laborers, while his brother Sm. M. Vizirescu became a writer. He began primary school in his native village, completing it in Slatina. He began secondary studies at Craiova's D. A. Sturdza military high school. He later went to Radu Greceanu High School in Slatina and to Carol I National College in Craiova, from which he graduated in 1925. Later that year, he entered the literature and philosophy faculty of the University of Bucharest, graduating in 1929. In 1938, Vizirescu obtained a doctorate from the same institution; the adviser on his thesis, which dealt with characteristic national poetry, was Constantin Rădulescu-Motru. 

Between 1930 and 1937, he taught at Ștefan cel Mare military high school in Cernăuți, as well as other high schools in the same city. From 1937 to 1939, he taught at Carol I High School in Bucharest. From 1939, he headed Curierul Serviciului Social, the press organ for the Dimitrie Gusti-founded Social Service. In 1940, he became an editor in the press section of the Propaganda Ministry. Later the same year, he became cabinet director in the same ministry, serving until 1944. In 1940, he directed Muncitorul român magazine, the official publication of the Labor Ministry. In 1945, after a Romanian Communist Party-dominated government came to power, he was sentenced to hard labor for life. However, he did not serve time, instead remaining in his parents' Slatina home until 1967.

Vizirescu's contributions appeared in Facla, Secolul (Craiova), Bilete de Papagal, Revista Fundațiilor Regale, Țara noastră, Viața literară, Familia, Gândirea, Universul, Curentul and Porunca vremii. His first published work, the sketch "Sfârșit duios", ran in Universul literar in 1922 and was signed with the pen name Dela Bârsa. His first book was Poezia noastră religioasă (1943). He published volumes of poetry (Poeme, 1982; Sunet peste culmi, 1985; Călătorie de taină, 1988; Mi se oprise timpul, 1995; Prins de lumină și har, 1995; Tărâmul însingurării mele, 2002; Orizonturi lirice, 2003; Armonii, 2003), essays (Coloane care cresc necontenit, 1999) and theater (Liga oamenilor cinstiți, 1997). He sometimes used the pen name Nicolae Ancuța Rădoi. Vizirescu died in Slatina.

Notes

1903 births
2000 deaths
People from Olt County
Carol I National College alumni
University of Bucharest alumni
20th-century Romanian poets
Romanian essayists
Romanian dramatists and playwrights
Romanian schoolteachers
Romanian civil servants
Romanian magazine editors
Romanian male poets
20th-century essayists
20th-century Romanian male writers